The Robin Hood Foundation is a charitable organization which attempts to alleviate problems caused by poverty in New York City. The organization also administers a relief fund for disasters in the New York City area. In 2010, a key supporter gave every family with children on welfare in New York State $200 to buy school supplies. In 2017, Robin Hood appointed author and US Army veteran Wes Moore as its first CEO. In September 2021, Richard Buery, Jr. joined Robin Hood as the new Chief Executive Officer.

History
Founded in 1988 and named after the heroic outlaw from English folklore, the Robin Hood Foundation was conceived by hedge fund manager Paul Tudor Jones and co-founded with Peter Borish and Glenn Dubin.

The foundation combines investment principles and philanthropy to assist programs that target poverty in New York City. In 2006, the board of directors included such names as Jeffrey Immelt, Diane Sawyer, Harvey Weinstein, Marie-Josee Kravis, Lloyd Blankfein of Goldman Sachs, Richard S. Fuld, Jr., formerly of Lehman Brothers, Glenn Dubin of Highbridge Capital, Marian Wright Edelman and actress Gwyneth Paltrow.

Funding for the organization's activities comes from donations and fund raising efforts. In 2009, George Soros gave the foundation a US$50 million contribution. The money reportedly helped the organization raise significantly more than that amount. In 2001 The Concert for New York City provided funds for the organization. After Hurricane Sandy, the 12-12-12: The Concert for Sandy Relief concert also provided funds for the foundation's efforts. Artists including The Rolling Stones, Robert Plant & The Strange Sensation, Shakira, John Legend, The Black Eyed Peas, Lady Gaga, The Who and Aerosmith have performed at the group's annual fund raising galas. During the COVID-19 pandemic, the Rise Up New York! telethon provided funds to those impacted by the pandemic.

As of 2016, the foundation was No. 79 on the Forbes 100 Largest U.S. Charities list.

In 2017, Robin Hood appointed author and veterans advocate Wes Moore as its CEO. Moore grew up in poverty in the Bronx before becoming a Rhodes scholar at the University of Oxford, a paratrooper and captain in the 82nd Airborne, and investment banker at Citigroup. Moore succeeded David Saltzman who was the Executive Director since co-founding the organization.

Wes Moore stepped down as CEO of Robin Hood Foundation in May 2021. Derek Ferguson, who served as Robin Hood’s Chief Operating Officer since December 2017 stepped into the role of Interim Chief Executive Officer, until a permanent replacement was identified. As of September 2021, Richard Buery, Jr. joined Robin Hood as the new Chief Executive Officer. Buery brings extensive experience in nonprofit and civic leadership to Robin Hood, after serving in leadership roles with Robin Hood partners like Achievement First and Children’s Aid, and as a Deputy Mayor of New York City.

In May 2022, during Robin Hood’s annual event to benefit poverty-fighting efforts in New York, the company announced the launch of a new, $100 million Child Care Quality and Innovation Initiative for New York City. The fund was created from commitments of $50 million from Robin Hood, $25 million from Ohanian’s 776 Foundation and $50 million from New York City. Additionally, the annual event raised $126 million, all of which will support poverty-fighting programs citywide.

Approach
According to the Foundation "Since 1988 Robin Hood has targeted poverty in New York City by supporting and developing organizations that provide direct services to poor New Yorkers as well as improving their earning power and long-term prospects. Robin Hood provides program grants, general operating support, capital grants, and funds to build management capacity."

Fortune magazine said "Robin Hood was a pioneer in what is now called venture philanthropy, or charity that embraces free-market forces. An early practitioner of using metrics to measure the effectiveness of grants, it is a place where strategies to alleviate urban poverty are hotly debated, ineffectual plans are coldly discarded, and its staff of 66 hatches radical new ideas."

More specifically, the foundation states that it applies the following principles:
Give 100 percent of every donation directly to programs helping poor New Yorkers
Identify and stop poverty at its roots
Protect and leverage Robin Hood's investments by using sound business principles to help programs become more effective
Use metrics and qualitative data to evaluate programs and measure results to compare the relative poverty-fighting success of similar programs

Programs
The Robin Hood Foundation works with more than 240 nonprofit organizations in New York and surrounding areas. They categorize their programs into "Core fund recipients" and "Relief fund recipients". Core fund recipients consist of four portfolios: early childhood, education, jobs and economic security, and survival.

Hurricane Sandy
The relief fund also benefited victims of Hurricane Sandy. As of March 14, 2013, they were "no longer accepting online grant applications for Hurricane Sandy Relief" (and resuming the organization's regular work).

COVID-19 Pandemic
On May 11, 2020, the Robin Hood Foundation partnered with New York area television stations, and local radio stations owned by iHeart Radio and Entercom to televise the Rise Up New York telethon to support those impacted by the COVID-19 pandemic. The event raised $110 million in approximately an hour.

Reception
The Robin Hood Foundation was featured in Fortune'''s 18 September 2006 issue, where the article states that the foundation is "one of the most innovative and influential philanthropic organizations of our time".  On September 16, 2013 the news show 60 Minutes'' aired a report on Jones and how the Foundation has given away more than 25 million dollars.

Founding Board Members
The founding members of the board were as follows:

References

External links

Foundations based in the United States
1988 establishments in New York City
Charities based in New York City